The 1990 1. divisjon season, the highest women's football (soccer) league in Norway, began on 28 April 1990 and ended on 6 October 1990.

18 games were played with 3 points given for wins and 1 for draws. Number nine and ten were relegated, while two teams from the 2. divisjon were promoted through a playoff round.

Sprint/Jeløy won the league, losing only one game.

League table

Top goalscorers
 23 goals:
  Petra Bartelmann, Asker
 21 goals:
  Hege Riise, Setskog/Høland
 16 goals:
  Lisbeth Bakken, Sprint/Jeløy
 11 goals:
  Ann Kristin Hansen, BUL
  Liv Strædet, Sprint/Jeløy
  Eva Gjelten, Trondheims-Ørn
 10 goals:
  Heidi Støre, Sprint/Jeløy
  Brit Sandaune, Trondheims-Ørn
 9 goals:
  Eli Landsem, Asker
  Gunn Nyborg, Asker
  Ellen Breiby, Sprint/Jeløy
  Katrin Skarsbø, Sprint/Jeløy

Promotion and relegation
 Fløya and Jardar were relegated to the 2. divisjon.
 Sandviken and Grand Bodø were promoted from the 2. divisjon through play-offs.

References

League table
Fixtures
Goalscorers

Norwegian First Division (women) seasons
Top level Norwegian women's football league seasons
women
Nor
Nor